Tappeh Bashi (also Romanized as Tappeh Bāshī) is a village in Azadlu Rural District, Muran District, Germi County, Ardabil Province, Iran. At the 2006 census, its population was 110, in 22 families.

References 

Towns and villages in Germi County